Acidalia Colles is a group of hills in the Mare Acidalium quadrangle of Mars, located at 50.9° north latitude and 23.1° west longitude. The term "Colles" is used for small hills or knobs. Gullies have been observed on Acidalia Colles.

References 

Mare Acidalium quadrangle
Hills on Mars